Mynors is both a surname and a given name. Notable people with the name include:

R. A. B. Mynors (1903–1989), British classical scholar
Roger Mynors Swinfen Eady, 3rd Baron Swinfen, (born 1938) peer of the House of Lords
Roger Mynors (MP), (died 1537) English politician
William Mynors, captain of the East India Company vessel the Royal Mary
Mynors Bright (1818–1883), English academic, president of Magdalene College, Cambridge from 1853 to 1873

See also
Mynors baronets, a title in the Baronetage of the United Kingdom